This is a list of the heritage sites in Gauteng as recognised by the South African Heritage Resource Agency.

|}

References

Gauteng
Heritage sies
Tourist attractions in Gauteng